Adam Rosenke  (born July 8, 1984 in Edmonton, Alberta) is a Canadian bobsledder who competed from  2008 to 2013. After a successful track and field career, Rosenke transitioned into bobsled, competing on the World Cup circuit for three seasons.

Career
Rosenke was a member of the Lyndon Rush and Christopher Spring teams on the World Cup Bobsleigh circuit in 2008-09 and 2012-13. Adam has a sprinting background at the University of Alberta placing 5th at nationals in 2008, after having spent a year at the University of Louisiana-Monroe on a full track and field scholarship. Currently, Rosenke considers himself a retired athlete and operates a successful family law practice in Calgary, Canada. At age 36, he has yet to rule out a comeback to competitive athletics.

References

External links
 Bobsleigh Canada Profile
 FIBT profile
 World Athletics Profile

Canadian male bobsledders
1984 births
Living people
University of Alberta alumni
University of Louisiana at Monroe alumni
Place of birth missing (living people)